Jose Diego Aspiras (August 18, 1924 – November 14, 1999) was a Filipino politician. He was a member of former President Ferdinand Marcos's cabinet, and was considered one of the most loyal political lieutenants from Marcos' “northern bloc” of political influence. He was the country's first Minister of Tourism, and was an assemblyman from La Union's at-large congressional district from 1984 to 1986. He is interred in the local Basilica Minore in Agoo, La Union, Philippines.

The Agoo-Baguio Road was formerly named "Jose D. Aspiras Highway" after him but was renamed to Palispis Highway after careful reconsideration by relevant authorities.

References

1924 births
1999 deaths
Members of the House of Representatives of the Philippines from La Union
Secretaries of Tourism of the Philippines
Ferdinand Marcos administration cabinet members
Members of the Batasang Pambansa